In September 2016, the International Union for Conservation of Nature (IUCN) listed 1988 data deficient mollusc species. Of all evaluated mollusc species, 27% are listed as data deficient. 
The IUCN also lists 40 mollusc subspecies as data deficient.

No subpopulations of molluscs have been evaluated by the IUCN.

This is a complete list of data deficient mollusc species and subspecies evaluated by the IUCN.

Gastropods
There are 1526 species and 37 subspecies of gastropod evaluated as data deficient.

Vetigastropoda
Teinostoma fernandesi
Teinostoma funiculatum

Stylommatophora
Stylommatophora includes the majority of land snails and slugs. There are 392 species and 32 subspecies in the order Stylommatophora evaluated as data deficient.

Partulids

Subulinids

Species

Subspecies
Opeas nothapalinus crenatum
Pseudoglessula leroyi fasciata

Achatinellids

Endodontids

Charopids

Helicarionids

Orthalicids

Euconulids

Rhytidids

Streptaxids

Species

Subspecies

Zonitids

Pupillids

Polygyrids

Species

Subspecies

Helminthoglyptids

Species
Shasta sideband (Monadenia troglodytes)
Subspecies

Camaenids

Lauriids

Vertiginids

Bradybaenids

Species

Subspecies
Euhadra scaevola mikawa

Helicids

Hygromiids

Enids

Other Stylommatophora

Species

Subspecies
Idaho banded mountain snail (Oreohelix idahoensis idahoensis)
Carinated striate banded mountain snail (Oreohelix strigosa goniogyra)

Littorinimorpha
There are 565 species and one subspecies in the order Littorinimorpha evaluated as data deficient.

Strombids
Ophioglossolambis violacea

Pomatiids

Hydrobiids

Cochliopids

Bithyniids

Species

Subspecies
Gabbiella humerosa tanganyicensis

Moitessieriids

Assimineids

Pomatiopsids

Lithoglyphids

Amnicolids

Stenothyrids

Iravadiids

Truncatellids

Sorbeoconcha
There are 97 species and one subspecies in the order Sorbeoconcha evaluated as data deficient.

Batillarids
Batillaria mutata

Pleurocerids

Melanopsids

Semisulcospirids
Oasis juga (Juga laurae)

Thiarids

Pachychilids

Paludomids

Species

Subspecies
Cleopatra bulimoides pauli

Architaenioglossa
There are 106 species and one subspecies in the order Architaenioglossa evaluated as data deficient.

Neocyclotids

Cyclophorids

Species

Subspecies
Chamalychaeus itonis nakashimai

Pupinids

Diplommatinids

Aciculids

Viviparids

Ampullariids

Lower Heterobranchia species

Cycloneritimorpha
There are 30 species and two subspecies in the order Cycloneritimorpha evaluated as data deficient.

Helicinids

Species

Subspecies
Pleuropoma zigzac ponapense
Pleuropoma zigzac zigzac

Hydrocenids

Neritids

Hygrophila species
There are 197 Hygrophila species evaluated as data deficient.

Physids

Acroloxids

Planorbids

Lymnaeids

Chilinids

Latiids
Latia lateralis

Neogastropoda
There are 113 species in the order Neogastropoda evaluated as data deficient.

Turrids

Marginellids

Buccinids

Muricids

Conids

Eupulmonata

Archaeopulmonata
Salinator sanchezi
Salinator swatowensis

Bivalvia
There are 171 species and three subspecies in the class Bivalvia evaluated as data deficient.

Pectinida
Nodipecten magnificus

Unionida
There are 95 species in the order Unionoida evaluated as data deficient.

Margaritiferids
Margaritifera dahurica
Margaritifera laevis

Unionids

Hyriids

Iridinids

Mycetopodids
Anodontites elongatus
Anodontites trigonus

Venerida
There are 74 species and three subspecies in the order Veneroida evaluated as data deficient.

Dreissenids
Dreissena iconica

Sphaeriids

Species

Subspecies
Musculium hartmanni naivashaens

Cyrenids

Species

Subspecies
Corbicula fluminalis cunningtoni
Corbicula fluminalis tanganyicensis

Donacids

Solecurtids
Novaculina siamensis

Mytilida
Sinomytilus morrisoni

Cephalopods
There are 291 cephalopod species evaluated as data deficient.

Idiosepiida

Octopuses
There are 34 octopus species evaluated as data deficient.

Umbrella octopuses

Argonautids
Argonauta cornuta

Cirroteuthids

Grimpoteuthis species

Sepioloida
There are 142 species in Sepioloida evaluated as data deficient.

Sepiids

Sepiolids

Sepiadariids

Oegopsina species
There are 104 Oegopsina species evaluated as data deficient.

Mastigoteuthidae

Enoploteuthids

Hooked squids

Chiroteuthids

Cranchiids

Octopoteuthids

Other Oegopsina species

Bathyteuthida

See also 
 Lists of IUCN Red List data deficient species
 List of least concern molluscs
 List of near threatened molluscs
 List of vulnerable molluscs
 List of endangered molluscs
 List of critically endangered molluscs
 List of recently extinct molluscs

References 

Molluscs
Data deficient molluscs